Salem College Administration Building is a historic school administration building located on the campus of Salem University at Salem, Harrison County, West Virginia.  It was built in 1909–1910, and is 2 1/2-story, stone and brick building with a truncated hipped roof and full basement in the Collegiate Gothic style.  It consist of an imposing central tower flanked by two symmetrical wings  The wings feature large, two-story, parapet-gabled wall dormers.  The roof is topped by small, hipped roof cupola.

It was listed on the National Register of Historic Places in 1989.

References

University and college buildings on the National Register of Historic Places in West Virginia
School buildings completed in 1910
Schools in Harrison County, West Virginia
Collegiate Gothic architecture in West Virginia
National Register of Historic Places in Harrison County, West Virginia
University and college administration buildings in the United States
Administration Building